Schloss Philippsfreude was a rococo Schloss in Wittlich in Rhineland-Palatinate, Germany. It served as a hunting lodge and summer palace for the Prince-Electors of Trier. It was destroyed by French revolutionary troops in 1797. Today, nothing is left anymore.

History
Werner von Falkenstein, Prince Elector and Archbishop of Trier, constructed a castle in Wittlich in 1402, called Burg Ottenstein. The castle was renovated and transformed various times up to in the 18th century. The prince-electors used the castle as a hunting lodge. In 1761, prince-elector and archbishop Johann IX Philipp von Walderdorff ordered the demolition of the castle in order to replace it by a new palace on the same location, Schloss Philippsfreude. The architect was Jean Antoine, who was preferred over the court architect Johannes Seiz. The first stone was laid on 29 March 1762 in presence of the prince-elector. The construction of the palace took only one and half years and was completed in 1763. 

The palace was designed in the style of the French rococo. It was destroyed by French revolutionary troops in 1794. After which the stones were sold up to 1804. 

Only the name of the square remembers of the palace: 'Schlossplatz' (palace square).

Bibliography
 Ulrike Glatz: ... in einer steinernen Urkunde lesen“: Geschichts- und Erinnerungsorte in Rheinland-Pfalz", Nünnerich-Asmus Verlag & Media GmbH (2013)
 Joachim Hupe: 'Burg Ottenstein in Wittlich Neue archäologische Erkenntnisse zuruntergegangenen kurfürstlichen Residenz' in: Trierer Zeitschrift 75/76 (2012/13) Pages 249-282
 Richard Hüttel: '... verloren, vergessen - Das Kurtrierisches Schloss Philippsfreude in Wittlich Eine Spurensuche', Kulturamt der Stadt Wittlich (2019)

References

External links
 https://www.peter-daus.de/_bilder/wittlich/Schloss-800px.jpg - Reconstruction drawing of Schloss Philippsfreude
 https://www.peter-daus.de/_bilder/wittlich/Burg-800px.jpg - Reconstruction drawing of Burg Ottenstein

Castles in Rhineland-Palatinate
Houses completed in the 18th century
Former palaces in Germany
Demolished buildings and structures in Germany